"Wer bin ich" is a rock song written by Bob Arnz and Gerd Zimmermann for LaFee's 2007 second album Jetzt erst recht. The song is the album's sixth track, and was released as its third single. The single reached 25 on the German Singles Charts when released in November 2007.

An English-language version of the song, "Tell Me Why", later appeared on LaFee's third studio album Shut Up.

Track listing 
CD single
 "Wer bin ich" – 4:16
 "Krank" – 2:10

CD maxi single
"Wer bin ich" (Single Version) – 4:17
"Wer bin ich" (Orchestral Version) – 4:28
"Wer bin ich" (Klassik Version) – 4:28
"Wer bin ich" (Album Version) – 4:28
"Wer bin ich" (Orchestral Instrumental) 4:26
"Wer bin ich" (Video) (Enhanced Part)
"Making Of Videodreh" [Part 2] (Enhanced Part)
"Fotogalerie" (Enhanced Part)

Charts

References

External links 
LaFee's official website

2007 singles
German songs
LaFee songs
2007 songs
Songs written by Bob Arnz
EMI Records singles
Songs written by Gerd Zimmermann (songwriter)